Dionte Hunter, better known by his stage name Chuuwee (born September 7, 1990) is an American hip hop artist from Sacramento, California.  Chuuwee spent many years of his life moving around as a child. He lived in nearly every neighborhood of Sacramento, CA before moving to San Antonio in middle school.

Chuuwee has a style unique to Northern Californians, smooth, street savvy, world conscious, & political lyrics, which set him apart from other Hip Hop Artists and Rappers. By Age 21, Chuuwee considered himself a master of song writing having developed a style in any and every genre of rap / Hip Hop and even bending the elements of Punk Rock and R&B in his current musical identity. Chuuwee has established a strong underground presence and is regularly featured on popular hip hop blogs and websites, such as 2DopeBoyz, HipHopDX, DJBooth, AllHipHop, Complex Magazine,  and others. He also received a feature in XXL magazine. He was interviewed by Forbes at SXSW '12 as a rising artist.

In 2010 Chuuwee was introduced to the manager of Max B and CEO of pioneering Hip Hop label Amalgam Digital, Next aka Anyextee who after hearing the track "Post Mortem" immediately signed the rapper to his management company, leveraging the label to promote his independent project "Watching The Throne". In 2011 Anyextee officially signed Chuuwee as a recording artist to the Amalgam Digital record label joining the home of Joe Budden, Curren$y, Lil B and other notable acts.

Chuuwee has worked with in the past include Cookin' Soul, Lee Bannon, Large Professor, as well as many others. He is currently signed to Below System Records for digital distribution and has released two albums (South Sac Mack / AmeriKKa's Most Blunted 2) through the label. He is soon to release a new 5 part album titled "Dystopia" in 2020.

Chuuwee is also the first human being to have a full music video shot in Volumetric Virtual Reality due to a 2016 collaboration with 8i Reality.

Discography

Albums
 Amerikkas Most Blunted (with Trizz) (2014)
 The Chuuwee Channel (2014)
 Economics (2016)
 Amerikkas Most Blunted 2 (with Trizz) (2016)
 Paradiso (2017)
 Purgator (2017)
 Sabbath (2017)
 PassOver (with Khalisol) (2018)
 The $ Bag (with Rich Icy) (2018)
 HUBRIS (2018)
 Amerikkas Most Blunted 3 (with Trizz) (2018)
 The Tip of a Tab (PO +) (2018)
 Nephilim (2019)
Non Fortuna (2019)
3.5 (Eighth) (with Trizz) (2020)
HoLLoW BaSTioN (2020)
Babylon (2020)
Hear No Equal (Unreleased Singles and Ideas) (2020)
Coronado (2020)

Mixtapes

 Mauve Monster (2009)
 Life of a Backpacker w/ Konkwest & Rufio (2009)
 Sunday Afternoon (2010)
 The Date Tape w/ Cookin' Soul (2010)
 So Far So Good (2010)
 Hot N' Ready w/ Lee Bannon (2010)
 Be Cool w/ Jonathan Lowell (2011)
 Watching the Throne (2011)
 Ch3z!: The Tape (2012)
 Crown Me King (2012)
 The Millennium Falcon(EP.1) [with Sundown(Actual Proof)] (2012)
 Ch3z!!?...Chill: A J Dilla Tribute (2012)
 Wild Style (2012)
 Hear No Equal (2013)
 Wild Style: B Side (2013)
 No Retail EP (2013)
 ThriLL (2013)
 The Great Gatzby (with Shae Money) (2013)
 Amerikkas Most Blunted (with Trizz) (2014)
 Cool World (2014)
 9k (2014)
 The South Sac Mack (with JR & PH7) (2015)
 Commerce EP (2016)
 26 (2016)
 Super Supreme (with Saltreze) (2016)
 Club 27 (2017)
 Oni over Rice - Single (2019)

References

1990 births
Living people
Rappers from Sacramento, California
21st-century American rappers
African-American male rappers
21st-century American male musicians
21st-century African-American musicians